Nicolas Mahut and Édouard Roger-Vasselin were the defending champions, but only Mahut chose to compete in the doubles competition.
He played with Marc Gicquel and they were the 3rd seed in the tournament, but lost to Brian Battistone and Harsh Mankad in the quarterfinal.
Thiago Alves and Franco Ferreiro won in the final 6–2, 5–7, [10–8], against Battistone and Mankad.

Seeds

Draw

Draw

References
 Doubles Draw

Doubles
2010